Donacaula maximellus is a moth in the family Crambidae. It was described by Charles H. Fernald in 1891. It is found in North America, where it has been recorded from Florida, Georgia, Louisiana, Mississippi, Nebraska, North Carolina and South Carolina.

Adults have been recorded year round.

Larvae have been recorded feeding on Zizaniopsis miliacea.

References

Moths described in 1891
Schoenobiinae